Cynisca was the first woman to win at the ancient Olympic Games.

Cynisca may also refer to:

Cynisca (horse), a Thoroughbred mare racehorse
Cynisca (lizard), a genus of lizards in the family Amphisbaenidae
Cynisca (moth), a synonym of the moth genus Siccyna in the family Erebidae